The Last Supper is the fourth album released by American stand-up comedian Jim Gaffigan. It focuses largely on his love of food.  The album's producer encouraged him to use profanity, and Gaffigan complied.

Track listing
The Food Network - 0:42
Late Night Eater - 0:37
American Eating - 0:26
All You Can Eat - 0:21
Cinnabon - 1:04
I'm a Vegetarian - 2:02
Food Critic - 1:03
Special Menu - 0:51
Your Waiter - 1:04
Wine Menu - 0:42
Appetizer - 0:58
I Love Bread - 0:44
From Entrée to Dessert - 1:04
Caliente Pockets - 3:48
Let's Talk Jesus - 3:27
Talking to Moses - 0:48
Respect for the Pope - 1:32
A Letter From Peter - 0:52
Radio Call: "Don't Talk About Jesus" - 3:08
Interview: Part I - 0:59
I Love Salads & Bars - 2:12
Grocery Store - 2:33
The Corruption of Granola - 1:10
Interview: Part II - 0:50
More Watery Water - 1:50
Interview: Part III - 1:56
Gravy and Cheese - 1:23
Country Crock - 1:03
The Mexican Conspiracy - 1:30
Drinking & Chatting - 4:11
Drunk Eating - 0:51
Jim's Homemade Hot Dog Recipe - 6:32

References 

2004 albums
Jim Gaffigan albums
2000s comedy albums